The Mount St. Mary's Mountaineers athletic teams represent Mount St. Mary's University in Emmitsburg, Maryland. "The Mount" competes in National Collegiate Athletic Association (NCAA) Division I athletics as a member of the Metro Atlantic Athletic Conference (MAAC).

The Mount sponsors 22 intercollegiate sports. Men's sports include baseball, basketball, cross country, golf, lacrosse, soccer, swimming & diving, tennis, track & field and water polo; while women's sports include soccer basketball, bowling, cross country, golf, lacrosse, rugby,  softball, swimming & diving, tennis, track & field and water polo.

Athletic divisions and conferences

Teams

Men's basketball 

Mount men's basketball won the 1962 NCAA Men's Division II Basketball Tournament by defeating the Sacramento State Hornets 58–57 and earned their first NCAA Division I men's basketball tournament win against the Coppin State Eagles in 2008.

Men's lacrosse 

The Mountaineers earned regular season conference titles in 1999, 2001, 2010, 2011, and 2019, won conference tournament championships in 2001, 2003, 2010, and 2011, and faced the University of Virginia in their 2003 and 2010 NCAA Division I men's lacrosse tournament appearances.

Men's soccer 

The Mount sponsored men's soccer from 1953 to 2012, participating in the NEC from 1988 to 2012. The sport was discontinued following the 2012 season for financial reasons but resumed in 2018.

Women's soccer

Facilities 
Sports facilities include E.T. Straw Family Stadium, Knott Arena, Morgan Track, Waldron Family Stadium, Our Lady of the Meadows Field, a swimming pool, and tennis courts.

Olympians

References

External links